Andries "Dries" Vorster is a South African Olympic hurdler. He represented his country in the men's 400 metres hurdles at the 1992 Summer Olympics. His time was a 49.75 in the hurdles.

References

1962 births
Living people
South African male hurdlers
Olympic athletes of South Africa
Athletes (track and field) at the 1992 Summer Olympics
World Athletics Championships athletes for South Africa